Keasby may refer to:

Keasbey, New Jersey
Anthony Quinton Keasbey (1824–1895), former US Attorney and author from New Jersey